The Scottish Aviation Bulldog is a British two-seat side-by-side (with optional third seat) training aircraft designed by Beagle Aircraft as the B.125 Bulldog.

The prototype Bulldog flew on 19 May 1969 at Shoreham Airport. The first order for the type was for 78 from the Swedish Air Board. Before any production aircraft were built, Beagle Aircraft ceased trading and the production rights for the aircraft, with the Swedish order, were taken over by Scottish Aviation (Bulldog) Limited. All subsequent aircraft were built at Prestwick Airport by Scottish Aviation, and later by British Aerospace.

Operational history

Sweden 
The first 58 aircraft (known as the SK 61A and SK 61B) were delivered to the Swedish Air Force in 1971. Twenty more aircraft were delivered to the Swedish Army as FPL 61C in 1972, although these were transferred to the Air Force in 1989 as SK 61C. By 2001 all the Swedish aircraft had been withdrawn from military service. 26 were bought in 2004 by the Hungarian company AVIA-Rent.

United Kingdom 

The largest customer was the Royal Air Force, which placed an order for 130 Bulldogs in 1972, entering service as the Bulldog T.1 in 1975. It was used by the Royal Air Force as a basic trainer, in particular as the standard aircraft of the University Air Squadrons and, later, Air Experience Flights, providing flying training.  The aircraft was also used by the Royal Navy for Elementary Flying Training (EFT) at RAF Topcliffe.

The RAF sold off its remaining Bulldog trainers in 2001 as general aviation light aircraft for a low price. They were replaced by the Grob Tutor.

Variants 

The following Bulldog models were produced:

Bulldog Series 1 One prototype built by Beagle Aircraft (G-AXEH), one built by Scottish Aviation; now in the collection of the National Museum of Flight at East Fortune, East Lothian.
Bulldog Series 100
Model 101: Export model for Sweden. Swedish military designation SK 61 (AF) or FPL 61 (Army). 78 built.
Model 102: Export model for Malaysia. 15 built.
Model 103: Export model for Kenya. Five built.
Model 104: Refurbished second prototype (G-AXIG)
 Model 121: Primary trainer for the Royal Air Force. RAF designation Bulldog T.1. 130 built, five of which transferred (sold) to the Armed Forces of Malta in 2000.
 Model 122: Export model for Ghana. Six built.
 Model 122A: Export model for Ghana. Seven built.
 Model 123: Export model for Nigeria. 37 built.
 Model 124: Company demonstrator (G-ASAL). Used for weapons trials.
 Model 125: Export model for Jordan. 13 built.
 Model 125A: Export model for Royal Jordanian Air Force. Nine built.
 Model 126: Export model for Lebanon. Six built.
 Model 127: Export model for Kenya. Nine built.
 Model 128: Export model for Royal Hong Kong Auxiliary Air Force. Two built.
 Model 129: One aircraft for a civil customer in Venezuela (YV-375-CP).
 Model 1210 : Export model for Botswana. Six built. Light attack variant with underwing hard points

Bulldog Series 200  Four-seat variant with retractable undercarriage. One prototype built (G-BDOG). Also known as the Bullfinch in civilian guise.

Operators

Military operators

Kenya Air Force

Lebanese Air Force

Former military operators

Botswana Air Force

Ghana Air Force

Royal Jordanian Air Force

Royal Hong Kong Auxiliary Air Force

Royal Malaysian Air Force

Maltese Air Wing

Nigerian Air Force

Swedish Air Force
Swedish Army

Royal Air Force

Aircraft on display
United Kingdom
Bulldog 104 G-AXIG at National Museum of Scotland, Edinburgh, Scotland.
Bulldog 125 G-BDIN at South Yorkshire Aircraft Museum, Doncaster, England. 
Bulldog T.1 XX634 at Newark Air Museum, Nottinghamshire.
Bulldog T.1 XX654 at Royal Air Force Museum Cosford, Shropshire.
Bulldog T.1 XX669 at South Yorkshire Aircraft Museum.
Bulldog T.1 XX520 at 172 (Haywards Heath) Squadron Air Training Corps (Haywards Heath TA Centre), Sussex
Bulldog T.1 XX637 at Ulster Aviation Society, Maze Long Kesh, Lisburn, Northern Ireland (Current markings are a XX530 tribute)

Specifications (Bulldog Series 120)

See also

References

External links
Scottish Aviation Bulldog Cockpit Flying Video

1970s British military trainer aircraft
Bulldog
Single-engined tractor aircraft
Low-wing aircraft
Bulldog
Aircraft first flown in 1969